Herbert Souell (February 5, 1913 – July 12, 1978) was an American baseball third baseman in the Negro leagues. He played from 1940 to 1950 with the Kansas City Monarchs. He also played in the minor leagues in the Western International League and Arizona–Texas League in 1952. He played for the Spokane Indians, Tucson Cowboys, and the Chihuahua Dorados.

References

External links
 and Seamheads

1913 births
1978 deaths
Kansas City Monarchs players
Spokane Indians players
People from West Monroe, Louisiana
Tucson Cowboys players
Baseball players from Louisiana
20th-century African-American sportspeople
Baseball infielders